Paul F. Jadin (born May 2, 1955) was the 40th mayor of Green Bay, Wisconsin, from 1995 to 2003.

Electoral history 
Jadin won his first general election with 55% of the vote and was the first mayor of Green Bay in over fifty years to run for re-election unopposed.

Prior to his election, Jadin had been the city's personnel director. After leaving office, he became president of the Green Bay Area Chamber of Commerce. He resigned the position on December 28, 2010. Shortly thereafter, he was appointed as the Secretary of the Wisconsin Department of Commerce in Governor Scott Walker's cabinet. 

In September 2012, CEO/Secretary Paul Jadin resigned from his position in the former Wisconsin Department of Commerce, which had become the Wisconsin Economic Development Corporation, to take a position with Thrive, which serves an eight-county region around Madison, Wisconsin.

Family
Jadin married Jane M. Stangel on August 27, 1982. They have four children.

References

1955 births
Living people
Mayors of Green Bay, Wisconsin